Ranzo is a comune (municipality) in the Province of Imperia in the Italian region Liguria, located about  southwest of Genoa and about  north of Imperia.

Ranzo borders the following municipalities: Aquila di Arroscia, Borghetto d'Arroscia, Casanova Lerrone, Nasino, and Onzo.

References

Cities and towns in Liguria